This is a list of public art in Boone County, Indiana.

This list applies only to works of public art accessible in an outdoor public space. For example, this does not include artwork visible inside a museum.

Most of the works mentioned are sculptures. When this is not the case (e.g., sound installation,) it is stated next to the title.

Lebanon

Zionsville

Notes

Boone County
Tourist attractions in Boone County, Indiana